Chaman-e Morvarid (also Romanized as Chaman-e Morvārīd) is a village in Balesh Rural District, in the Central District of Darab County, Fars Province, Iran. At the 2013 census, its population was 4,320, in 523 families.

References 

Populated places in Darab County